Per Gunnar Larsson (born 30 January 1946) is a retired Swedish sprint canoer. He was part of four-men teams that finished fourth and eighth in the K-4 1000 m event at the 1968 and 1972 Olympics, respectively.

References

1946 births
Canoeists at the 1968 Summer Olympics
Canoeists at the 1972 Summer Olympics
Living people
Olympic canoeists of Sweden
Swedish male canoeists
People from Jönköping
Sportspeople from Jönköping County